in Japanese Buddhism is the appearance of the Amida Buddha on a "purple" cloud (紫雲) at the time of one's death.

Depictions 
The Amida would arrive either accompanied by two bodhisattva, making it a triad depiction, or with a large retinue that also includes musicians playing celestial music accompanying the Buddha. The Buddha would then lift the spirit of the deceased up and ascend back to the pure land. The belief of the Western Paradise for the souls is the most popular. 

It has given rise to a type of Japanese paintings (raigō-zu). As a ritual, such a painting is carried into the house of a person who is near death.

Among the upper classes, raigō paintings and sculpture became very popular, as they depicted the Amida Buddha coming down in celebration in relation to dead relatives or to one's own house. Some of these paintings are clearly yamato-e, or Japanese paintings in that they gave artists a chance to paint Japanese landscapes.

References

External links 

Buddhism in Japan
Pure Land Buddhism
Amitābha Buddha